Nizhneshakarovo (Tübänge Şäkär) is a rural locality (a village) in Saraysinsky Selsoviet, Sterlibashevsky District, Bashkortostan, Russia. The population was 74 as of 2010. There are 2 streets.

Geography 
Nizhneshakarovo is located 33 km southeast of Sterlibashevo (the district's administrative centre) by road. Verkhneshakarovo is the nearest rural locality.

References 

Rural localities in Sterlibashevsky District